USNS Watertown (T-AGM-6) was a Watertown-class missile range instrumentation ship acquired by the United States Navy in 1960 and converted from her SS Niantic Victory Victory ship cargo configuration to a missile tracking ship, a role she retained for eleven years before being placed out of service in 1971.

Victory ship constructed in Oregon
Niantic Victory was laid down on 12 February 1944 at Portland, Oregon, by the Oregon Shipbuilding Corporation under a U.S. Maritime Commission contract (MCV hull 100); launched on 25 April 1944; sponsored by Mrs. Marvin Owen; and delivered to the Maritime Commission on 18 May 1944.  She was built in just 96 days under the Emergency Shipbuilding program by the War Shipping Administration.

Maritime service

World War II
From 1944 until 1957, Niantic Victory was operated for the U.S. Maritime Commission by a succession of contractor firms. Her first operator was the American-Hawaiian Steamship Company for service during World War II starting on 18 May 1944. She supplied cargo in the Pacific Ocean for the Pacific War.
After the war on 6 November 1946 she was operated by Waterman SS Corporation as part of the Marshall Plan. On 30 May 1948 after completing her relief efforts she was removed from service and placed in the National Defense Reserve Fleet in Wilmington, N.C. She was laid up till 24 August 1950, but with a new war starting in the Far East she was remove cleaned up and chartered to Union Sulphur and Oil Company.

Korean War
During the Korean War she was operated by the Union Sulphur and Oil Company. SS Niantic Victory served as merchant marine naval supplying goods for the Korean War.  About 75 percent of the personnel taking to Korean from the Korean War came by the merchant marine. SS Niantic Victory transported goods, mail, food and other supplies. About 90 percent of the cargo was moved by merchant marine naval to the war zone. SS Niantic Victory made trip between 18 November 1950 and 23 December 1952 helping American forces engaged against Communist aggression in South Korea. At the end of the war on 8 April 1955 her operator was changed to Pope and Talbot SS Company. On 11 December 1956 operator was changed to Isbrandtsen Company till 1957.  She was laid up in the National Defense Reserve Fleet in Suisun Bay, Benicia, Calif., on 24 January 1958.

US Navy
On 11 August 1960 she was transferred to the US Navy. She was reassigned to the Military Sea Transportation Service (MSTS) for conversion to a Missile Range Instrumentation Ship. Conversion was completed 27 November 1960 and she was renamed the USNS Watertown (T-AGM-6). She was lead ship of three ships in her class.

Missile tracking service
Niantic Victory was now the Navy Department Military Sea Transportation Service range instrumentation ship, USNS Watertown (T-AGM-6). For the next 11 years, she served in the Pacific Ocean in support of the National Aeronautics and Space Administration and the U.S. Air Force on the latter service's Western Missile Test Range. She operated as a mobile tracking station, recording test data from missiles and satellites out of range of land-based stations.

Watertown carried instrumentation to track and record flight events for military missile and NASA manned spacecraft, extending the coverage of the tracking network over the Pacific Ocean. She was slated at one time to be part of the Apollo 8 recovery team but was dropped from the program. In 1969, she called at Pitcairn Island.

Two other ships were reconfigured in to this new class, Watertown-class missile range instrumentation ship, the USNS Huntsville (T-AGM-7) and the USNS Wheeling (T-AGM-8).

Inactivation
In February 1971, the Air Force decided that it no longer required Watertowns services and she was removed from service. Her name was struck from the Navy Directory on 16 February 1972, and she was returned to the Maritime Administration at its berthing facility at Suisun Bay, California, on 23 May 1974. She was sold to Dongkuk Steel Mill Co., Ltd on 23 May 1974 and scrapped in Pusan, South Korea. She arrived in South Korea on 16 July 1974.

References

Further reading
  
 Service Ship Photo Archive – T-AGM-6 Watertown, NavSource Online
 [1] According to NavSource Online, Niantic Victory was laid up on 24 January 1958, in the National Defense Reserve Fleet, Suisun Bay, Benicia, Calif.

Victory ships
Ships built in Portland, Oregon
1944 ships
World War II merchant ships of the United States
Missile range instrumentation ships of the United States Navy
Watertown-class missile range instrumentation ships
Cold War auxiliary ships of the United States
Ships of American Export-Isbrandtsen Lines